Nawadaha Falls is a waterfall on the Presque Isle River and is located in the Porcupine Mountains Wilderness State Park in Gogebic County, Michigan.  The falls has a drop of approximately 15 feet and a crest of 50–150 feet.  It is above both Manido Falls and Manabezho Falls.  Access to this waterfall requires climbing some rugged trails.

References
Great Lakes Waterfalls

Protected areas of Gogebic County, Michigan
Waterfalls of Michigan
Landforms of Gogebic County, Michigan